BST, Bst or bst may refer to:

Time zones
 Bangladesh Standard Time, the time zone of Bangladesh, UTC+6:00
 Bering Standard Time, the standard time at UTC−11
 British Summer Time, the daylight saving time zone for the United Kingdom, UTC+1
 Burma Standard Time, the standard time zone for Myanmar (Burma)

Science
 Biochemical Society Transactions, journal of the Biochemical Society
Bacillus stearothermophilus, nowadays called Geobacillus stearothermophilus, a species of bacterium
 Barium strontium titanate 
 Baumann Skin Types, a skin-type classification system
 Binary search tree, a data structure
 Biochemical systems theory, a mathematical modelling framework
 Bituminous surface treatment, a sealing coat for pavements
 Bone marrow stromal antigen, a lipid raft associated protein
 Bovine somatotropin, a type of growth hormone

Places
 Badger State Trail
 Banks–Vernonia State Trail, a paved rail trail and state park in northwest Oregon
 Bass Strait Triangle

Schools
 Bengal School of Technology, a private pharmacy college located in Chinsurah, Hooghly district, India
 Brisbane School of Theology, a bible college in Toowong, Brisbane, Queensland
 British School of Tenerife, a British international school in Tenerife, Spain
 British School Tripoli, a British international school in Tripoli, Libya
 The British School in Tokyo, an international school in central Tokyo

Transportation
 IATA airport code of Bost Airport, an airport along the Helmand River in Afghanistan
 Bangalore Suburban Transport, the older name for the Bangalore Metropolitan Transport Corporation
 Batik Solo Trans, a bus rapid transit in Indonesia
 Transportation Safety Board of Canada (Bureau de la sécurité des transports du Canada)
 Bombardier Sifang Transportation Ltd., a Chinese manufacturer of MUs in the railway industry

Other
 Brigade spécialisée de terrain, a police unit of the Central Directorate of Public Security in France
 Basic Safety Training, training in basic firefighting, survival, safety, and first aid
 Bavarian–Austrian Salt Treaty, European treaty
 Bilal Satellite Television, an Islamic media production in Ethiopia
 Blood, Sweat & Tears, American jazz-rock group
 British Summer Time (concerts), an annual music festival held in Hyde Park, London
 Broom Street Theater, an experimental theater in Madison, Wisconsin
 Browser-side templating, a templating strategy for web applications
 .bst, a filename extension for BibTeX style files